These quarterbacks have started at least one regular season or postseason game for the Ottawa Redblacks of the Canadian Football League. This list does not include preseason appearances. They are listed in order of the date of each player's first start at quarterback for the Redblacks.

Regular season
The number of games they started during the season is listed to the right:

References
 Ottawa Redblacks game notes/position charts

Ottawa Redblacks
Starting quarterbacks